Manuela Melchiorri (born 11 April 1970 in Rome) is a retired Italian freestyle swimmer who won two bronze medals at the 1989 European Aquatics Championships. She also competed at the 1988 and 1992 Summer Olympics in the 400 m and 800 m freestyle events but did not reach the finals. Between 1986 and 1992 she won 22 national titles in the 200–800 m freestyle and 200 m butterfly events.

References

1970 births
Living people
Olympic swimmers of Italy
Swimmers at the 1988 Summer Olympics
Swimmers at the 1992 Summer Olympics
Italian female freestyle swimmers
European Aquatics Championships medalists in swimming
Mediterranean Games silver medalists for Italy
Mediterranean Games medalists in swimming
Swimmers at the 1987 Mediterranean Games